Hilda Peters (born 9 August 1983) is a New Zealand rugby league footballer who plays for the New Zealand Warriors in the NRL Women's Premiership.

Primarily a er, she is a New Zealand representative.

Background
Born in Auckland, Peters began playing rugby league when she was 19. Her younger sisters, Rona and Kahurangi, are also New Zealand Test representatives. 

Peters, who is of Māori descent, has a moko kauae (a traditional Māori face tattoo) and is fluent in te reo.

Playing career
On 9 November 2014, Peters made her debut for New Zealand in their 12–8 win over Australia, playing alongside her sisters Rona and Kahurangi.

In November 2017, she was a member of New Zealand's 2017 Women's Rugby League World Cup squad.

On 31 July 2018, she was named in the inaugural New Zealand Warriors NRL Women's Premiership squad. Her try was the first ever try scored in the NRL Women's Premiership.

In September 2020, Hale was one of five New Zealand-based Warriors' players to travel to Australia to play in the 2020 NRL Women's premiership. Due to COVID-19 restrictions, the players had to quarantine for 14 days on entering Australia and 14 days on return to New Zealand when the season was completed.

References

External links
NZ Warriors profile

1983 births
Living people
New Zealand Māori rugby league players
New Zealand female rugby league players
New Zealand women's national rugby league team players
Rugby league wingers
Rugby league second-rows
Rugby league hookers
New Zealand Warriors (NRLW) players